Shing Uk Tsuen is a village in Wang Chau, Yuen Long District, Hong Kong.

Location
Shing Uk Tsuen is located north of Kai Shan and Yuen Long Industrial Estate, next to the villages of Tai Tseng Wai and Ng Uk Tsuen. The area north of the villages, Fung Lok Wai, features fish ponds.

Administration
Shing Uk Tsuen is a recognized village under the New Territories Small House Policy. It is one of the 37 villages represented within the Ping Shan Rural Committee. For electoral purposes, Shing Uk Tsuen is part of the Ping Shan North constituency.

History
Shing Uk Tsuen was a single-clan village established by the Shing who moved from Nga Tsin Tsuen in Ping Shan around 1466.

Features
A row of five houses, Nos. 39, 40, 41, 42 and 43, was built no later than the 1870s in the last row of four rows of houses in the historic village. The houses have been vacated. They have been listed as Grade III historic buildings.

The three villages of Tai Tseng Wai, Ng Uk Tsuen and Shing Uk Tsuen all share the gods hall in Tai Tseng Wai and the Tin Hau temple near Ng Uk Tsuen.

References

Further reading

External links

 Delineation of area of existing village Shing Uk Tsuen (Ping Shan) for election of resident representative (2019 to 2022)
 Map showing the location of Graded Historic Buildings (GB) and Ungraded Built Heritage Resources (HB): 
 Pictures of Nos. 39, 40, 41, 42, 43 Shing Uk Tsuen:     
 Webpage about Shing Uk Tsuen (in Chinese)

Villages in Yuen Long District, Hong Kong
Wang Chau (Yuen Long)